Manduca lefeburii is a moth of the  family Sphingidae.

Distribution 
It is found from Mexico, Belize, Nicaragua and Costa Rica to Venezuela, Bolivia, Paraguay and Brazil.

Description 
The wingspan is 89–110 mm. It is similar in appearance to several other members of the genus Manduca, but a number of differences distinguish it from Manduca andicola, Manduca incisa and Manduca jasminearum, to which it most closely compares, particularly in its uniform forewing upperside with a conspicuous dark band.

Biology 
There are at least two generations per year in Costa Rica with adults on wing from May to June and again from August to December. In Bolivia, adults have been recorded from October to December.

The larvae feed on Casearia arguta, Casearia sylvestris and Casearia corymbosa.

Subspecies
Manduca lefeburii lefeburii (Mexico, Belize, Nicaragua and Costa Rica to Venezuela, Bolivia, Paraguay and Brazil)
Manduca lefeburii bossardi (Gehlen, 1926) (Mexico)

References

Manduca
Moths described in 1844